People v. Collins was a 1968 American robbery trial in California noted for its misuse of probability and as an example of the prosecutor's fallacy.

Trial
After a mathematics instructor testified about the multiplication rule for probability, though ignoring conditional probability, the prosecutor invited the jury to consider the probability that the accused (who fit a witness's description of a black male with a beard and mustache and a Caucasian female with a blond ponytail, fleeing in a yellow car) were not the robbers, suggesting that they estimated the odds as:

The jury returned a guilty verdict.

Appeal
The California Supreme Court set aside the conviction, criticizing the statistical reasoning for ignoring dependencies between the characteristics, e.g., bearded men commonly sport mustaches, and for drawing an incorrect statistical inference.  This mistaken inference, commonly called the prosecutor's fallacy, incorrectly equates the probability that a random defendant has certain traits with the chance that the defendant is guilty. 

The Court said of the fallacy "we think that the entire enterprise upon which the prosecution embarked, and which was directed to the objective of measuring the likelihood of a random couple possessing the characteristics allegedly distinguishing the robbers, was gravely misguided. At best, it might yield an estimate as to how infrequently bearded Negroes drive yellow cars in the company of blonde females with ponytails."

The court noted that the correct statistical inference would be the probability that no other couple who could have committed the robbery had the same traits as the defendants given that at least one couple had the identified traits.  The court noted, in an appendix to its decision, that using this correct statistical inference, even if the prosecutor's statistics were all correct and independent as he assumed, the probability that the defendants were innocent would be over 40%.

The court asserted that mathematics, "...while assisting the trier of fact in the search of truth, must not cast a spell over him."  In particular, the court expressed its concern that complex mathematics would distract the jury from weighing the credibility of witnesses and the reasonableness of their doubts.  The court also expressed concern that if mathematics became common tools for prosecutors that there would not be enough defense attorneys skilled at mathematics to put on a skilled defense.

See also
Howland will forgery trial

References

Bibliography

External links

California state case law
Forensic statistics
1968 in United States case law
1968 in California